Robert McIntosh or derivatives may refer to:

Bert McIntosh (1892–1952), Scottish footballer 
Bobby McIntosh, rapper
 Robbie McIntosh (born 1957), English guitarist
Robert McIntosh (cricketer) (1907–1988), English cricketer
 Robbie McIntosh (drummer) (1950–1974), Scottish drummer
Robert A. McIntosh (born 1943), United States Air Force general
Robert J. McIntosh (1922–2008), United States Representative from Michigan
Robert "Say" McIntosh (born 1944), restaurateur and political activist from Little Rock, Arkansas